Torana (Kannada: ತೋರಣ), also known as Bandanwal, refer to a decorative door hanging in Hinduism, usually decorated with marigolds and mango leaves, or a string that is tied on the door with the flower on it as a part of traditional Hindu culture on the occasion of festivals and weddings.  A toran may feature colours such as green, yellow and red. They can be made of fabrics or metals which are usually made to resemble mango leaves. Peepal tree leaves are also used to make torans at some places in India. They also have other decorative features depending on the region.

The origin of torans can be traced to Puranas (Hindu mythological work). Torans are used to decorate the main entrance of the home. The main idea behind decorating the homes is to please and attract the goddess of wealth, Lakshmi. These torans are the first thing that welcomes guests.

See also
 Thoranam, hanging decorations in Tamil Nadu 
 Torana, in Hindu-Buddhist Indian-origin also found in Southeast Asia and East Asia

References

External links

Torans you can make at home 

Textile arts of India